Rhododendron falconeri, the falconer rhododendron, is a species of flowering plant in the family Ericaceae, native to the eastern Himalayas. Flowers are white to cream, pale yellow, or pinkish, with a prominent purple blotch.

It occurs from eastern Nepal through Sikkim and Bhutan, as well as adjacent areas of northeastern India (Arunachal Pradesh and West Bengal).

In cultivation in the UK, Rhododendron falconeri has gained the Royal Horticultural Society’s Award of Garden Merit. It is hardy down to  but requires a sheltered position. Like most rhododendrons it needs an acid soil that is rich in leaf mould.

References

External links
 Rhododendr. Sikkim-Himalaya 1: t. 10 1849.
 The Plant List
 Species Portrait: Rhododendron falconeri Hooker F., 1849, Steve Hootman, Journal American Rhododendron Society, Volume 57, Number 2, Spring 2003.
 Rhododendron Species Botanical Garden
 Hirsutum

falconeri
Flora of the Indian subcontinent